The Dutch corvette Waakzaamheid was launched at Enkhuizen in 1786. The French Navy captured her in 1794 and renamed her Vigilance. She was part of a squadron that in 1794 captured or destroyed a large number of British merchant vessels on the Guinea coast. The French returned her to the Dutch (the Batavian Republic), in 1795. The Dutch Navy returned her name to Waakzaamheid. The British Royal Navy captured her without a fight in 1798. She then served as HMS Waaksaamheid until she was sold in September 1802.

Career

Waakzaamheid
Waakzaamheid was launched in 1786.

Vigilance
The French Navy captured Waaksamheid on 23 May 1794. They renamed her Vigilance. She then served in a squadron on the Guinea Coast.

In 1795 the French sold Vigilance to the Batavian Republic.

Waakzamheid
On 24 October 1798  captured in the Texel  Waakzaamheid and the frigate Furie. Waakzaamheid was under the command of Senior Captain Neirrop. She was armed with twenty-four 9-pounder guns on her main deck and two 6-pounders on her forecastle. She had 100 Dutch seamen aboard her, as well as 122 French troops, and was carrying 2000 stands of arms as well as other ordnance stores. Waakzaamheid put up no struggle. The sloop  shared in the capture.

HMS Waaksaamheid
Waaksamheid arrived at Sheerness on 17 November 1798. She underwent fitting there between July 1799 and May 1800.

In August 1800 Waaksamheid= was part of fleet under the command of Vice-admiral Archibald Dickson that accompanied a diplomatic mission to Copenhagen under Lord Whitworth. The fleet does not appear to have gone beyond The Skaw. The fleet returned to Yarmouth on 14 September.

Captain Robert Hall was promoted to post captain on 18 November 1799.

In 1800 Waaksaamheid participated in cruises off the Dutch coast in Dickson's squadron, and escorted convoys in the North Sea between the Baltic and Leith. On 11 October 1801 she was at Sheerness, waiting to be paid off following the signing of the Peace of Amiens.

Fate
The "Principal Officers and Commissioners of his Majesty's Navy" offered "Waaksamheidt, 504 Tons, Copper-bottomed, and Copper braces, and Pintles, lying at Deptford", for sale on 1 August 1802. She was offered for sale again on 9 September. She sold then.

Notes

Citations

References
 
 
 
 

1786 ships
Ships built in the Netherlands
Captured ships
Corvettes of the French Navy
Post ships of the Royal Navy